Kepler-443b is an exoplanet about 2,540 light-years from Earth. It has an 89.9 percent chance of being in the star's habitable zone, yet only a 4.9 percent chance of being rocky.

Characteristics

Mass, radius and temperature 
Kepler-443b has a mass of 6.04 Earth masses, a radius of 2.33 Earth radii and a temperature of 247 kelvin.

Host star 
Kepler-443b orbits a K-type star called Kepler-443, 2541 light-years away.

Orbit 
Kepler-443b takes 177.6693 days to orbit its star, with an inclination of 89.94°, a semimajor axis of 0.495 AU and  an eccentricity of at least 0.11.

Habitability 
Kepler-443b may be habitable, but the planet has only a 4.9 percent chance of being rocky. The planet is much more likely to be a water world or a Mini-Neptune.

References

Exoplanets discovered in 2015
Exoplanets discovered by the Kepler space telescope
Transiting exoplanets
Super-Earths in the habitable zone

Cygnus (constellation)